The A9 motorway is a motorway in the Netherlands. The motorway starts off by going from the A1 at Diemen (junction Diemen) to the A2 at junction 'Holendrecht' (on the 'Gaasperdammerweg').

Overview
Here one drives approximately two kilometers south by means of the combined A9/A2 before the A9 heads off to the west again towards Amstelveen, junction 'Badhoevedorp' (A4), junction 'Raasdorp' (A5), junction 'Rottepolderplein' (A200) and on to junction 'Velsen' (A22). Hereafter, the A9 goes further northward by means of the Wijkertunnel under the North Sea Canal, junction 'Beverwijk' (A22) to Alkmaar. At this point, the A9 motorway becomes the N9 highway and proceeds until De Kooy (at Den Helder).

In 1996, the Wijkertunnel was opened and integrated into the A9. The original route of the A9 ran through the Velsertunnel where there is also a connection with the A208. This part still exists but this portion of motorway has been re-numbered to A22.

The part between A1 and A2 is four lanes; between A2 and Rottepolderplein it is six lanes. Hereafter the way is mainly four lanes, with short pieces in the area of the Wijkertunnel that are six lanes.

With regard to the Gaasperdammerweg, it is noted in the original plans that this road would not become a motorway. The plan was to build a local link-road for the occupants of the Bijlmermeer. The section between A2/A9 and A1/A6 was never built, although this would have formed a natural connection between A9 and A6. Because of this, the Gaasperdammerweg has developed into an overflowing connection between A2 and A1.

Discussions on extending the A9 in a straight line to the A6 are still going on. Because this part of the route would pass by the Naardermeer, environmentalists oppose this plan.

Exit list

Route description of the N9 highway 

From the last exit of the A9 motorway, the road becomes a highway (called N9) and continues along:

 Alkmaar
 Schoorl
 Schagerbrug
 't Zand
 Julianadorp
 De Kooy

External links 

 Map

Motorways in the Netherlands
Motorways in North Holland